Anupgarh district(in Hindi ज़िला अनूपगढ़  and Rajasthani जिलो अनूपगढ़, in Punjabi  ਜ਼ਿਲ੍ਹਾ ਅਨੂਪਗੜ੍ਹ ) is a  new proposed north-west  district of Rajasthan state in western India. It will be carved out  of Ganganagar district. Anupgarh,Gharsana and Rawla tehsils of the Ganganagar district will also be parts of this new district. The Raisinghnagar tehsil and Khajuwala tehsil can also be included in this district.

History
Ancient history:- Baror is an archeological site about 13 kms far from Anupgarh city.It belongs with ancient Indus Valley civilization. Pre Harappan and Harappan pottery has been found after excavation.
Mediaeval period:-The ancient  name of Anupgarh city was Chugher. Chugher (Anupgarh) and its surrounding area was occupied by Bhati rulers. The area occupied by the removal of Bhation Bikaner Maharaja of the princely state under the leadership of chef Bikaji Anoop Singh Sun in 1678 built a fortress whose name was Anupgarh.

Famous places

 
 Laila Majhnu Mazar - Binjor 
 Rojhari Bala ji temple

References

Districts of Rajasthan